In Greek mythology, Thrasymedes (Ancient Greek: Θρασυμήδης means 'bold of thought') was a prince of Pylos and a participant in the Trojan War.

Family 
Thrasymedes was the oldest son of King Nestor and Eurydice (or Anaxibia) and the elder brother of Antilochus. His other siblings were Peisistratus, Pisidice, Polycaste, Perseus, Stratichus, Aretus, Echephron, and Antilochus.

Mythology

Iliad
Thrasymedes was one of the more prominent younger leaders portrayed in the Iliad, though not to the extent of his brother. He fought bravely throughout the entire war. In the Iliad he was one of the lead sentries and was present at night when the Greek wall was built. When Diomedes and Odysseus went on a spying expedition he gave the former his armour and sword before they left. When his brother was killed by Memnon he helped his father fight for possession of the dead body, but due to Memnon's superior strength they were forced to withdraw and enlist the help of Achilles.  Once he whipped Odysseus, mistaking him for a beggar after the latter stole the Luck of Troy.  He was also one of the Danaans to enter the Trojan Horse.

Thrasymedes survived the war and returned home with his father, presumably inheriting his kingdom when his father died. However he is said to have fought for many years against invaders who sacked Pylos in the 12th century BC—the ancestors of the Spartans—and this was just the beginning of the centuries long struggle between Messini and Sparta.

Odyssey
In the Odyssey, Telemachus visited him at Pylus whilst searching for news on his lost father Odysseus.

See also
Voidokilia beach

Notes

References 

 Apollodorus, The Library with an English Translation by Sir James George Frazer, F.B.A., F.R.S. in 2 Volumes, Cambridge, MA, Harvard University Press; London, William Heinemann Ltd. 1921. ISBN 0-674-99135-4. Online version at the Perseus Digital Library. Greek text available from the same website.
Gaius Julius Hyginus, Fabulae from The Myths of Hyginus translated and edited by Mary Grant. University of Kansas Publications in Humanistic Studies. Online version at the Topos Text Project.
 Homer, The Iliad with an English Translation by A.T. Murray, Ph.D. in two volumes. Cambridge, MA., Harvard University Press; London, William Heinemann, Ltd. 1924. . Online version at the Perseus Digital Library.
Homer, Homeri Opera in five volumes. Oxford, Oxford University Press. 1920. . Greek text available at the Perseus Digital Library.
 Homer, The Odyssey with an English Translation by A.T. Murray, PH.D. in two volumes. Cambridge, MA., Harvard University Press; London, William Heinemann, Ltd. 1919. . Online version at the Perseus Digital Library. Greek text available from the same website.

Children of Nestor (mythology)
Princes in Greek mythology
Achaeans (Homer)
Characters in the Odyssey
Pylian characters in Greek mythology